(born 1961) is a Japanese astronomer. He is a prolific observer of asteroids and comets, as well as a discoverer of minor planets. He has worked extensively at the Kuma Kogen Astronomical Observatory near Kuma, Ehime Prefecture, where he remains a staff member. His observations of asteroid brightness are well known.

Career 

Nakamura is also member of the Yamaneko Group of Comet Observers. He named main-belt asteroid 44711 Carp for his favorite baseball team, the Hiroshima Carp, and named 9081 Hideakianno after Japanese animation and film director, Hideaki Anno.

Awards and honors 

The asteroid 10633 Akimasa, orbiting between Mars and Jupiter, is named after him and was named in 1999 to coincide with his becoming a father.

List of discovered minor planets

See also

References

External links
 Kuma Kogen Astronomical Observatory - English version

20th-century Japanese astronomers
Discoverers of asteroids

Living people
1961 births
21st-century Japanese astronomers